The Kusacode Mahadeva Temple is a shrine in Kerala, India. The temple comes under "Major" temples listed under Travancore Devaswom Board of Kerala. The main festivals of the temple are the yearly eight-day festival known as "Thrikkodiyettu mahotsavam", Shivarathri and Thiruvathira days. The temple is considered to be one of the busiest in the district on Shivrathri day after the Sreekanteshwaram Temple

Hindu temples in Thiruvananthapuram district
Shiva temples in Kerala